The 1988 Colgate Red Raiders football team was an American football team that represented Colgate University during the 1988 NCAA Division I-AA football season.  Colgate tied for third in the Colonial League. 

In its first season under head coach Michael Foley, the team compiled a 2–9 record. Mike Cote and Matt Jaworski were the team captains. 

The Red Raiders were outscored 271 to 169. Their 2–3 conference record placed Colgate in a three-way tie for third (and for next-to-last) in the six-team Colonial League standings.

The team played its home games at Andy Kerr Stadium in Hamilton, New York.

Schedule

References

Colgate
Colgate Raiders football seasons
Colgate Red Raiders football